Korovci (Prekmurje Slovene: Korouvci) is a village in the Municipality of Cankova in the Prekmurje region of northeastern Slovenia, right on the border with Austria.

References

External links
Korovci on Geopedia

Populated places in the Municipality of Cankova